Curtis Cokes (June 15, 1937 – May 29, 2020) was a boxer from Dallas, Texas, United States. Cokes was the simultaneous WBA, WBC and The Ring World Welterweight Champion, and he was famous for his training regimen, which he also imposed on other boxers training with him.

Pre-championship career
On March 24, 1958, Cokes began to box professionally, defeating Manuel Gonzalez, whom he would later fight for the world title, in a six round decision. He won eleven fights in a row, including a second match with Gonzalez, before losing to Gonzalez in their third fight, on April 27, 1959. His next fight, against Garland Randall on June 18 of the same year, ended in a three round no contest. He and Randall had an immediate rematch and on August 27, he knocked out Randall in the first round. He had an additional fourteen fights, going 11-2-1 in that span (his one draw was against Kenny Lane, a boxer who twice challenged Carlos Ortiz for world championships), before facing Luis Rodriguez, another world welterweight champion, on September 3, 1961. He beat Rodriguez by a ten round decision, outpointed Gonzalez in their fourth fight, and lost to Rodriguez in their second fight, also by points. He went 13-4 in his next seventeen fights, and, after losing in a ten round decision to Eddie Pace at Los Angeles, California, on August 27, 1964, he announced his retirement. On October 14 of that year, however, he announced he was returning to boxing.

Championship 
After winning three fights in a row, he and Gonzalez were matched for a fifth time, on August 24, 1966, this time for the WBA/WBC vacant world welterweight title, in New Orleans. Cokes outpointed Manuel Gonzalez to become world welterweight champion. On November 28 of 1966, he retained the crown against Jean Josselin of France in a fifteen round decision. Nat Fleischer was one of the judges for that fight.

On May 19, 1967, he retained the title with a tenth round knockout of Francois Villeiman, and on October 2, he met Charlie Shipes, who was recognized as champion in California. He knocked Shipes out in eight rounds in Oakland.

On April 18, 1968, he retained his title with a fifth round knockout of Willie Ludick, and on October 21, with a fifteen round decision over Ramon La Cruz.

Post-championship career 
Cokes lost the world welterweight title on April 18 of 1969, being knocked out by Cuban José Nápoles in thirteen rounds, in Los Angeles. On June 29 the pair had a rematch, in Nápoles' adopted hometown of Mexico City, Mexico, and Nápoles repeated his victory, this time by a tenth round knockout.

Cokes had eleven more fights before retiring, winning seven, losing three and drawing in one. His last three fights were in South Africa. He retired after a ten round decision win against Ezra Mnzinyane on October 5 of 1972.

Cokes had a record of 62 wins, 14 losses and four draws, with 30 wins by knockout.

After boxing 
Cokes became a trainer after he retired. Some of the fighters he worked with include Quincy Taylor and Ike Ibeabuchi.

Cokes also made one film appearance in the year of his retirement. He appeared in the 1972 John Huston film Fat City alongside future Academy Award winner Jeff Bridges and Stacy Keach.

In 2003, Cokes was inducted into the International Boxing Hall of Fame.

Death
Cokes died at age 82 of heart failure on May 29, 2020.

Professional boxing record

See also

List of world welterweight boxing champions

References

External links

 

1937 births
2020 deaths
American male boxers
African-American boxers
20th-century African-American sportspeople
21st-century African-American people
Sportspeople from Dallas
Boxers from Texas
World Boxing Association champions
World Boxing Council champions
The Ring (magazine) champions
Welterweight boxers
World welterweight boxing champions
International Boxing Hall of Fame inductees